Jeanne d'Ussel, also known as Jeanne de Clermont (or Auvergne) was countess of Forez, received in inheritance, belonging to the House of Ussel. 
She was married in June 1371 to Béraud II (dauphin d'Auvergne). Through marriage, Jeanne brought the fiefdom of d’Ussel in Languedoc, and the county of Forez, and eventually became known as "Jeanne de Forez" or "Jeanne de Clermont" in reference to her husband Béraud de Clermont, Dauphin d'Auvergne of the House of Clermont-Tonnerre of the Counts of Clermont-Tonnerre.

The House of Ussel belongs to the old family branch of the viscounts of the House of Limoges created by the ancient House of Brittany of the Kingdom of Brittany originated by Judicael ap Hoel King of Domnonée or Saint Judicaël of Brittany.

Direct Family and Descendants 
Jeanne's marriage to Béraud II produced one daughter:
Anne of Forez (1358 - † 1417 at Cleppé), born Lady Anne d'Auvergne Clermont and d’Ussel, countess of Forez, wife to Louis II de Bourbon (v. 1336 - † 1410), Duke of Bourbon, gave birth to James or Jean I de Bourbon (1381 - † 1434), Duke of Auvergne.

References 
 La Mure, J. M. de (1675 manuscript, 1860) Histoire des ducs de Bourbon et des comtes de Forez (Paris), Tome III, Preuves, 114 b, p. 157.
 Histoire ecclésiastique et civile du Languedoc, Origine des familles: volume I
 Historie du Château d’Ussel (1536)
 Valbonnais, Marquis de (1722) Histoire de Dauphiné (Geneva), Tome II, CCLXII, p. 576.
 Régis Valette, Catalogue de la Noblesse française, 4ème édition, Paris, Robert Laffont, p. 188. "d'Ussel, Limousin, Marche, extraction chevaleresque, 1358, baron en 1813 (47)".
 Robert de Lasteyrie, Etude sur les comtes et vicomte de Limoges antérieure à l'An Mil, 1874

Year of birth missing
Year of death missing
French countesses